Peter Alfred Taylor (30 July 1819 – 20 December 1891) was a British politician, anti-vaccinationist and radical.

Biography

Taylor was born in London. He was the son of another Peter Alfred Taylor, a silk merchant, and the nephew of Samuel Courtauld. He was educated at a school in Hove, Sussex, run by J. P. Malleson, his uncle and the Unitarian minister for Brighton. Here he met Clementia Doughty, whom he married in 1842.

In the late 1830s he joined the family company of Samuel Courtauld & Co, later becoming a partner. The wealth from the company was what allowed him to develop and fund his radical interests, something which he conducted in concert with his wife.

Taylor was an anti-vaccinationist. He commented that vaccination was a "delusion-a baseless superstition; that it afforded no protection from smallpox". He was President of the London Society for the Abolition of Compulsory Vaccination.

Parliamentary career
After unsuccessful candidatures at Newcastle upon Tyne in 1858 and Leicester in 1861, he was elected unopposed as a Liberal MP for Leicester in February 1862. At his election, when his programme included abolition of church rates and separation of church and state, he was attacked as ‘anti-everything’. He was a member of the Emancipation Society, founded in 1862 to promote the cause of the northern states in the American Civil War. He was a vice-president and one of the few middle-class supporters of the Reform League, constituted early in 1865 to campaign for manhood suffrage and the ballot, and appeared on league platforms during the parliamentary reform crisis of 1866–7. He attempted to achieve unity with the National Reform Union, which sought the more limited aim of household suffrage. With John Stuart Mill he was a parliamentary spokesman for the Jamaica Committee, formed in response to Edward John Eyre's brutal suppression of riots in Jamaica during the Morant Bay rebellion.

In 1863 Taylor bought the freehold of Aubrey House, a large detached house in the Campden Hill area of Holland Park in West London. The Taylors opened the Aubrey Institute in the grounds of the house; the institute gave young people the chance to improve a poor education they might have had. The Taylors were closely involved in the movement for Italian unification and Giuseppe Mazzini was a frequent visitor to Aubrey House. A reception for Giuseppe Garibaldi was held at Aubrey House during his celebrated 1864 visit to London.

Clementia's "Pen and Pencil Club" at Aubrey House, at which the work of young writers and artists was read and exhibited, became noted. In addition, Aubrey House was known for salons with radical attendees. The Taylor's social gatherings were also described by the American author Louisa May Alcott.

A London County Council blue plaque commemorates the Taylors and other notable residents of Aubrey House.

In 1873 ill health forced Taylor to retire from London to Brighton, where he founded clubs for working men, notably the Nineteenth Century Club, a forum for advanced radical and secularist views. He stood down from parliament in June 1884. Taylor died at home on 20 December 1891 and was buried at the Extramural Cemetery in Brighton on the 23rd.

Selected publications

Current Fallacies About Vaccination (1881)
Anti-Vaccination (1882)
Speeches of Mr. P.A. Taylor and Mr. C.H. Hopwood on Vaccination (1883)
Personal Rights (1884)

References

 
; cited as TayODNB.

External links 
 

1819 births
1891 deaths
British anti-vaccination activists
Liberal Party (UK) MPs for English constituencies
UK MPs 1859–1865
UK MPs 1865–1868
UK MPs 1868–1874
UK MPs 1874–1880
UK MPs 1880–1885